Odyan Bay (Russian: Залив Одян, trans.: Zaliv Odyan) is a small bay on the north coast of the Sea of Okhotsk. It is in the eastern corner of Taui Bay. The bay is entered between Cape Beringa to the northeast and Cape Skalisty to the southwest. It is 19.3 km (about 12 mi) wide. The high entrance points of the bay merge to form a low, sandy shore at its head. Ice remains in the bay longer than in other parts of Taui Bay. It is sheltered from all but west winds. Umara Island lies just off its south shore.

References

Bays of the Sea of Okhotsk
Bays of Magadan Oblast
Pacific Coast of Russia